Torque, in comics, may refer to:

 Torque (DC Comics), a DC Comics supervillain
 Torque, three Marvel Comics characters:
Torque (Marvel Comics), a Marvel Comics superhero from the MC2 universe and member of X-People
Torque, a member of the Twisted Sisters
 Torque, two Valiant Comics characters:
 Torque, the alias used by John Torkelson, who appeared in Harbinger
 Torque Magnus, the son of Leeja Clane and Magnus, Robot Fighter

See also
Torque (disambiguation)
Torquemada (comics)

References